Dabri is a village in Punjab, Pakistan.

Dabri may also refer to:

Dabri, Delhi, a neighbourhood in Delhi, India
Bholar Dabri, town in West Bengal, India
Dabri Chhoti, Village in Rajasthan, India

Dabri, Jodhpur, a village in Jodhpur district, Rajasthan, India

See also 
Dabri Chhoti, a village in Churu district, Rajasthan, India